Calcium-regulated heat stable protein 1 (CARHSP1) also known as calcium-regulated heat-stable protein of 24 kDa (CRHSP-24) is a protein that in humans is encoded by the CARHSP1 gene.

References

Further reading